Patrick Clifford was a member of the Wisconsin State Assembly.

Biography
Clifford was born on December 19, 1854. After residing for a time in Clyman (town), Wisconsin, he moved to Marinette, Wisconsin in 1871.

Career
Clifford was elected to the Assembly in 1888. Previously, he had been elected Sheriff of Marinette County, Wisconsin in 1886. He was a Democrat.

References

Politicians from Columbus, Ohio
People from Dodge County, Wisconsin
People from Marinette, Wisconsin
Democratic Party members of the Wisconsin State Assembly
Wisconsin sheriffs
1854 births
Year of death missing